Joël François Mesot (born 31 August 1964) is a Swiss physicist and academic. He is currently the President of the Swiss Federal Institute of Technology in Zurich, also known as ETH Zurich.

Biography
Mesot was born in Geneva, Switzerland, where he grew up. He studied physics at the ETH Zurich from 1984 to 1989, followed by doctoral studies at the same university as well as at the Institut Laue-Langevin, Grenoble in France. In 1992, he was awarded a PhD in physics (Dr. sc. nat.) from the ETH Zurich with a thesis on high-temperature superconductors supervised by Albert Furrer. Thereafter he joined the Paul Scherrer Institute (PSI) as a researcher in the field of neutron scattering. He continued his research at the Argonne National Laboratory in Chicago to perform angle-resolved photoemission spectroscopy (ARPES) experiments. In 1999, he returned to the PSI, where he was responsible for the laboratory investigating neutron scattering. He became chair of the PSI Research Commission in 2007. In August 2008, he was promoted to head the entire operations at PSI as its Director. At the same time, he was named full professor at the ETH Zurich as well as at the EPF Lausanne. He is a member of the ETH Board since 2010. Mesot is a trustee of the Marcel Benoist Prize committee. Since January 2019, he is President of the ETH Zurich. Mesot is the first President of the ETH Zurich coming from the French speaking part of Switzerland. He is fluent in French, German and English.

Awards 
 1995: IBM prize of the Swiss Physical Society for Outstanding Work in Neutron Spectroscopic Studies of the Crystal Field in High-Tc Superconductors.
 2002: Latsis prize of the ETH Zurich for his outstanding contribution to the investigation of high-temperature superconductors by neutron scattering and angle resolved photoemission spectroscopy.

References 

1964 births
Living people
Academic staff of ETH Zurich
Swiss physicists